The 2014 FIL European Luge Championships took place under the auspices of the International Luge Federation at Sigulda, Latvia from 25 to 26 January 2014. This was the third time Sigulda hosted the event.

Medalists

Medal table

References 

FIL European Luge Championships
FIL European Luge Championships
FIL European Luge Championships
Luge in Latvia
International luge competitions hosted by Latvia
Sport in Sigulda
January 2014 sports events in Europe